Gaayam 2 is a 2010 Telugu-language crime film, produced by Dr. C. Dharmakartha on Kartha Creations, presented by Ram Gopal Varma and directed by Praveen Sri. Jagapathi Babu, Vimala Raman  and the music is composed by Ilayaraja. It is a sequel to the 1993 Telugu film Gaayam.

Plot
The film begins with Ram a food court owner in Bangkok who leads a happy life with his wife Vidya and son Chaitanya. Once Ram rescues his female worker from the psychopath killers and it focuses him before the media. Watching it, Gurunarayana in India stuns as he resembles his old arch-rival Durga one that was declared dead long ago. Now Shankar Narayana, son of Gurunarayana proceeds to Bangkok along with their Lawyer Saab. thereby, they kidnap Chaitanya which compels Ram to open up his identity. Being cognizant of it, Vidya deserts him as he concealed his thug's life. But she realizes her mistake after hearing the fact from an Indian-origin Bangkok cop Pandyan. Indeed, Chaitanya is the son of ex-love interest Anitha. As he lost everyone in a bomb blast planted by Guru Narayana. Before dying, Anitha takes a word from him to quit the bloodshed life for which he turned as Ram. 

At the moment of reunion of the couple the brutal attack in which Chaitanya gets injured. Thereafter, Shankar Narayana & Lawyer Saab are back in India. Durga is also behind them leaving Vidya & Chaitanya in Pandyan's custody to keep a dead end to this violence. Meanwhile, Guru Narayana again forms a non-allied group and creates public riots to fulfill his aspiration of becoming Chief Minister. Parallelly, Durga starts his mission of eliminating his men when Shanker Narayana hides. For the counterattack, Guru Narayana hires a new gangster Aziz Pasha when a gang war begins again. 

After some time, Durga senses a mole in his gang and identifies him as his cop friend ACP Murthy who has been threatened by Shankar Narayana as his family captivated. Right now, Durga plays the double game by passing false information by presenting the Lawyer Saab as the deceiver before Shankar Narayana. As a result, Shankar Narayana gets out of his cover and kills Lawyer Saab where he is death blown by Durga. Later in a chase, Durga saves Murthy's family. Knowing it, enraged Guru Narayana creates huge riots again in the city while Durga tries to bar it, he hits a shot. Guru Narayana meets Durga in the hospital and confesses his deeds for his aspirations by fooling the people. Surprisingly it's all Durga's trap that exposes the entire conversation before the media to awake the public. At last, Durga takes revenge by stamping out Guru Narayana. Finally, the film ends with Durga now becoming a Godfather in the city by trying to resolve in an idealistic manner with a rationalist approach along with his wife and son.

Cast
 Jagapathi Babu as Ram/Durga
 Vimala Raman as Vidya
 Kota Srinivasa Rao as Guru Narayan
 Tanikella Bharani as Lawyer Saab 
 Kota Prasad as Shankar Narayan
 Ravi Kalle as ACP Murthy
 Raghunatha Reddy as I.G
 Harsha Vardhan as Harsha
 Sivakrishna as Inspector Bharadwaj (Cameo role)
 Jeeva as Pandyan
 Revathi as Anitha (Cameo role)
 Ajay as Aziz Pasha 
 Annapoorna
 Pavansriram as Chaitanya

Soundtrack

The music for the film was composed by Ilaiyaraaja and released by ADITYA Music Company.

References

External links 

2010 films
2010s Telugu-language films
Films scored by Ilaiyaraaja
Indian sequel films
Indian crime thriller films
2010 masala films
2010 crime thriller films